In college football, 2020 NCAA football bowl games may refer to:

2019–20 NCAA football bowl games, for games played in January 2020 as part of the 2019 season.
2020–21 NCAA football bowl games, for games played in December 2020 as part of the 2020 season.